Donald Stacey Linden (March 3, 1877 – March 13, 1964) was a Canadian athlete who competed mainly in the 1500 metre walk.

He competed for Canada in the 1906 Intercalated Games held in Athens, Greece in the 1500 metre walk where he won the silver medal.

References
 

1877 births
1964 deaths
Canadian male racewalkers
Olympic track and field athletes of Canada
Olympic silver medalists for Canada
Medalists at the 1906 Intercalated Games
Athletes (track and field) at the 1906 Intercalated Games